Aogu Wetland is a wetland in Dongshi Township, Chiayi County, Taiwan.

History
The wetland used to be a main agricultural land of Taiwan Sugar Corporation for farming, fishing, husbandry and sugarcane plantation. However, due to the continuing subsidence of the area caused by the seawater invading the groundwater, the land became unsuitable for agriculture. As time passes by, the area became a wetland during high tide. In 2009, the wetland was designated as the location for Aogu Wildlife Conservation Sanctuary and oversee by Chiayi County Government.

Geology
The wetland is located at the mouth of Beigang River and Luijiao Drainage Channel. It spands over an area of 1,500 hectares, making it the largest wetland in Taiwan. It features more than 200 species of bird.

Ecology
The habitat of the wetland consists of deep water swamps, dry farmlands, marshes, mudflats, paddy fields and windbreak forest. Terrestrial birds and water birds often fly to this place to find foods. Various species of fish are also found in the fish ponds.

Transportation
The wetland is accessible by bus from Chiayi Station of Taiwan Railways.

See also
 List of tourist attractions in Taiwan

References

External links

 

Landforms of Chiayi County
Wetlands of Taiwan